Lithuania at the UCI Road World Championships is an overview of the Lithuanian results at the UCI Road World Championships. The Lithuania competitors are selected by coaches of the Lithuanian Cycling Federation.

Prior to World War II Lithuanian cyclists been competing at the Olympics, but never started at the UCI Road World Championships. Lithuanian cyclist regularly competed at the UCI Road World Championships from 1975 under Soviet Union flag. During this period Lithuanian cyclists won two golds, five silvers and one bronze medals. Although Lithuania regained its independence in 1990, Lithuanian cyclists were allowed to compete under Lithuanian flag only from 1992. Country participated in every single world championships since.

List of medallists
This a list of all Lithuanian medals (including elite, amateur, under-23 and junior races) under Lithuanian flag.

Medals by discipline
Updated after 2020 UCI Road World Championships

References

Nations at the UCI Road World Championships
Lithuania at cycling events